National War Memorial may refer to:
National War Memorial (South Australia), in Adelaide
National War Memorial (Canada), in Ottawa
National War Memorial (Newfoundland), Canada
National War Memorial (India), in New Delhi
National War Memorial Southern Command, Maharashtra, India
Irish National War Memorial Gardens, Dublin, Ireland
National War Memorial (New Zealand), in Wellington